Liang Qichao (Chinese: 梁啓超 ; Wade-Giles: Liang2 Chʻi3-chʻao1; Yale: Lèuhng Kái-chīu) (February 23, 1873 – January 19, 1929) was a Chinese politician, social and political activist, journalist, and intellectual. His thought had a significant influence on the political reformation of modern China. He inspired Chinese scholars and activists with his writings and reform movements. His translations of Western and Japanese books into Chinese further introduced new theories and ideas and inspired young activists.

In his youth, Liang Qichao joined his teacher Kang Youwei in the reform movement of 1898. When the movement was defeated, he fled to Japan and promoted a constitutional monarchy and organized political opposition to the dynasty. After the revolution of 1911, he joined the Beiyang government, serving as the chief justice and the first president of the currency system bureau. He became dissatisfied with Yuan Shikai and launched a movement to oppose his ambition to be emperor. After Yuan's death, he served as the finance chief of the Duan Qirui cabinet and as supervisor of the Salt Administration. He advocated the New Culture Movement and supported cultural change but not political revolution.

Biography

Family
Liang Qichao was born in a small village in Xinhui, Guangdong Province on February 23, 1873. Liang's father, Liang Baoying (Cantonese: Lèuhng Bóu-yīng; courtesy name Lianjian ; Cantonese: Lìhn-gaan), was a farmer and local scholar, but had a classical background that emphasized on tradition and education for ethnic rejuvenescence allowed him to be introduced to various literary works at six years old. By the age of nine, Liang started writing thousand-word essays and became a district-school student soon after. Liang had two wives: Li Huixian (Cantonese: Léih Waih-sīn) and Wang Guiquan (Cantonese: Wòhng Gwai-chyùhn).  They gave birth to nine children, all of whom became successful individuals through Liang's strict and effective education. Three of them were scientific personnel at the Chinese Academy of Sciences, including Liang Sicheng, the prominent historian of Chinese architecture.

Early life
Liang passed the Xiucai degree provincial examination at the age of 11.  In 1884, he undertook the arduous task of studying for the traditional governmental exams.  At the age of 16, he passed the Juren second level provincial exams and was the youngest successful candidate at that time.

In 1890, Liang failed in his Jinshi degree national examinations in Beijing and never earned a higher degree. He took the exams along with Kang Youwei, a famous Chinese scholar and reformist. According to one popular narrative of Liang's failure to pass the Jinshi, the examiner was determined to flunk Kang for his heterodox challenge to existing institutions, but since the exams were all anonymous, he could only presume that the exam with the most unorthodox views was Kang's. Instead, Kang disguised himself by writing an examination eight-legged essay espousing traditionalist ideas and passed the exam while Liang's paper was assumed to be Kang's and picked out to be failed.

Inspired by the book Illustrated Treatise on the Maritime Kingdoms by the reform Confucian scholar Wei Yuan, Liang became extremely interested in western political thought.  After returning home, Liang went on to study with Kang Youwei,  who was teaching at Wanmu Caotang in Guangzhou.  Kang's teachings about foreign affairs fueled Liang's interest in reforming China.

In 1895, Liang went to the capital Beijing again with Kang for the national examination. During the examination, he was a leader of the Gongche Shangshu movement. After failing to pass the examination for a second time, he stayed in Beijing to help Kang publish Domestic and Foreign Information. He also helped to organize the Society for National Strengthening, where Liang served as secretary. For time, he was also enlisted by the governor of Hunan, Chen Baozhen to edit reform-friendly publications, such as the Hunan Daily (Xiangbao ) and the Hunan Journal (Xiang xuebao ).

Reform movements 
As an advocate of constitutional monarchy, Liang was unhappy with the governance of the Qing Government and wanted to change the status quo in China. He organized reforms with Kang Youwei by putting their ideas on paper and sending them to the Guangxu Emperor (reigned 1875–1908) of the Qing dynasty. This movement is known as the Wuxu Reform or the Hundred Days' Reform. Their proposal asserted that China was in need of more than "self-strengthening", and called for many institutional and ideological changes such as getting rid of corruption and remodeling the state examination system. Liang thus was a major influence in the debates on democracy in China.

This proposal soon ignited a frenzy of disagreement, and Liang became a wanted man by order of Empress Dowager Cixi, the leader of the political conservative faction who later took over the government as regent. Cixi strongly opposed reforms at that time and along with her supporters, condemned the "Hundred Days' Reform" as being too radical.

In 1898, the Conservative Coup ended all reforms, and Liang fled to Japan, where he stayed for the next 14 years. While in Tokyo he befriended the influential politician and future Japanese Prime Minister Inukai Tsuyoshi. In Japan, he continued to actively advocate the democratic cause by using his writings to raise support for the reformers’ cause among overseas Chinese and foreign governments. He continued to emphasize the importance of individualism, and to support the concept of a constitutional monarchy as opposed to the radical republicanism supported by the Tokyo-based Tongmeng Hui (the forerunner of the Kuomintang). During his time in Japan, Liang also served as a benefactor and colleague to Phan Boi Chau, one of Vietnam's most important anticolonial revolutionaries.

In 1899, Liang went to Canada, where he met Dr. Sun Yat-Sen among others, then to Honolulu in Hawaii. During the Boxer Rebellion, Liang was back in Canada, where he formed the "Chinese Empire Reform Association". This organization later became the Constitutionalist Party which advocated constitutional monarchy. While Sun promoted revolution, Liang preached incremental reform.

In 1900–1901, Liang visited Australia on a six-month tour that aimed at raising support for a campaign to reform the Chinese empire and thus modernize China through adopting the best of Western technology, industry and government systems. He also gave public lectures to both Chinese and Western audiences around the country. This visit coincided with the Federation of the six British colonies into the new nation of Australia in 1901. He felt this model of integration might be an excellent model for the diverse regions of China.  He was feted by politicians, and met the first Prime Minister of Australia, Edmund Barton.  He returned to Japan later that year.

In 1903, Liang embarked on an eight-month lecture tour throughout the United States, which included a meeting with President Theodore Roosevelt in Washington, DC, before returning to Japan via Vancouver, British Columbia, Canada.

The descendant of Confucius Duke Yansheng was proposed as a replacement for the Qing dynasty as Emperor by Liang Qichao.

Politician
In the Hundred Days' Reform, Liang Qichao had the idea of nationalism, and he advocated reformation and constitutional monarchy to change the social situation of the Qing dynasty.

For the construction of the modernization, Liang Qichao focused on two relative questions in politics. The first one was the ways that transformed people became citizen for modernization, and Liang Qichao thought Chinese needed to improve civic ethos to build the nation-state in the Qing dynasty, and the second one was the question of the citizenship, and Liang Qichao thought both of them were important to support the reformation in the Qing dynasty.

With the overthrow of the Qing dynasty, constitutional monarchy became an increasingly irrelevant topic. Liang merged his renamed Democratic Party with the Republicans to form the new Progressive Party. He was very critical of Sun Yatsen's attempts to undermine President Yuan Shikai. Though usually supportive of the government, he opposed the expulsion of the Nationalists from parliament.

Liang Qichao's thought was impacted by the West, and he learned the new political thought and regime of the Western countries, and he learned these from the Japanese translation books, and he learned the Western thought through Meiji Japan to analyze the knowledge of the West.

In 1915, he opposed Yuan's attempt to make himself emperor. He convinced his disciple Cai E, the military governor of Yunnan, to rebel. Progressive party branches agitated for the overthrow of Yuan and more provinces declared their independence. The revolutionary activity that he had frowned upon was utilized successfully. Besides Duan Qirui, Liang was the biggest advocate of entering World War I on the Allied side. He felt it would boost China's status and also ameliorate foreign debts. He condemned his mentor, Kang Youwei, for assisting in the failed attempt to restore the Qing in July 1917. After failing to turn Duan Qirui and Feng Guozhang into responsible statesmen, he gave up and left politics.

Despite the failures of his reforms, Liang Qichao’s idea of Chinese nationalism based on the civic idea of Five Races Under One Nation inspired Sun Yat-sen and the Kuomintang’s nationalism, as well as the nationalist rhetoric of the CCP.

Contributions to journalism

As a journalist
Lin Yutang once called Liang "the greatest personality in the history of Chinese journalism," while Joseph Levenson, author of Liang Ch'i-ch'ao and the Mind of Modern China, described Liang as "a brilliant scholar, journalist, and political figure."

Liang Qichao was the "most influential turn-of-the-century scholar-journalist," according to Levenson.  Liang showed that newspapers and magazines could serve as an effective medium for communicating political ideas.

Liang, as a historian and a journalist, believed that both careers must have the same purpose and "moral commitment," as he proclaimed, "by examining the past and revealing the future, I will show the path of progress to the people of the nation." Thus, he founded his first newspaper, called the Qing Yi Bao, named after a student movement of the Han dynasty.

Liang's exile to Japan allowed him to speak freely and exercise his intellectual autonomy. During his career in journalism, he edited two premier newspapers, Zhongwai Gongbao and Shiwu Bao. He also published his moral and political ideals in Qing Yi Bao and New Citizen.

In addition, he used his literary works to further spread his views on republicanism both in China and across the world. Accordingly, he had become an influential journalist in terms of political and cultural aspects by writing new forms of periodical journals. He published his articles in the magazine New Youth to expand the thought of science and democracy in 1910s. Furthermore, journalism paved the way for him to express his patriotism.

New Citizen Journal
Liang produced a widely read biweekly journal called New Citizen (Xinmin Congbao ), first published in Yokohama, Japan on February 8, 1902.

The journal covered many different topics, including politics, religion, law, economics, business, geography and current and international affairs. In the journal, Liang coined many Chinese equivalents for never-before-heard theories or expressions and used the journal to help communicate public opinion in China to faraway readers. Through news analyses and essays, Liang hoped that the New Citizen would be able to start a "new stage in Chinese newspaper history."

A year later, Liang and his co-workers saw a change in the newspaper industry and remarked, "Since the inauguration of our journal last year, there have come into being almost ten separate journals with the same style and design."

Liang spread his notions about democracy as chief editor of the New Citizen Journal. The journal was published without hindrance for five years but eventually ceased in 1907 after 96 issues.  Its readership was estimated to be 200,000.

Role of the newspaper
As one of the pioneers of Chinese journalism of his time, Liang believed in the "power" of newspaper, especially its influence over government policies.

Using newspapers and magazines to communicate political ideas: Liang realised the importance of journalism's social role and supported the idea of a strong relationship between politics and journalism before the May Fourth Movement, (also known as the New Culture Movement). He believed that newspapers and magazines should serve as an essential and effective tool in communicating political ideas. The magazine New Youth became an important way to show his thought in the New Culture Movement, and his articles spread the ideas to the youth in that period. He believed that newspapers did not only act as a historical record, but was also a means to "shape the course of history."

Press as a weapon in revolution: Liang also thought that the press was an "effective weapon in the service of a nationalist uprising". In Liang's words, the newspaper is a “revolution of ink, not a revolution of blood.” He wrote, "so a newspaper regards the government the way a father or elder brother regards a son or younger brother — teaching him when he does not understand, and reprimanding him when he gets something wrong." Undoubtedly, his attempt to unify and dominate a fast-growing and highly competitive press market has set the tone for the first generation of newspaper historians of the May Fourth Movement.

Newspaper as an educational program: Liang was well aware that the newspaper could serve as an "educational program", and said, "the newspaper gathers virtually all the thoughts and expressions of the nation and systematically introduces them to the citizenry, it being irrelevant whether they are important or not, concise or not, radical or not. The press, therefore, can contain, reject, produce, as well as destroy, everything."

For example, Liang wrote a well known essay during his most radical period titled "The Young China" and published it in his newspaper Qing Yi Bao on February 2, 1900. The essay established the concept of the nation-state and argued that the young revolutionaries were the holders of the future of China. This essay was influential on the Chinese political culture during the May Fourth Movement in the 1920s.

Weak press: However, Liang thought that the press in China at that time was quite weak, not only due to lack of financial resources and to conventional social prejudices, but also because "the social atmosphere was not free enough to encourage more readers and there was a lack of roads and highways that made it hard to distribute newspapers". Liang felt that the prevalent newspapers of the time were "no more than a mass commodity".  He criticized that those newspapers "failed to have the slightest influence upon the nation as a society".

Literary career

Liang Qichao was both a traditional Confucian scholar and a reformist. Liang Qichao contributed to the reform in late Qing by writing various articles interpreting non-Chinese ideas of history and government, with the intent of stimulating Chinese citizens' minds to build a new China. In his writings, he argued that China should protect the ancient teachings of Confucianism, but also learn from the successes of Western political life and not just Western technology. Therefore, he was regarded as the pioneer of political fiction.

Liang shaped the ideas of democracy in China, using his writings as a medium to combine Western scientific methods with traditional Chinese historical studies. Liang's works were strongly influenced by the Japanese political scholar Katō Hiroyuki, who used methods of social Darwinism to promote the statist ideology in Japanese society. Liang drew from much of his work and subsequently influenced Korean nationalists in the 1900s.

Historiographical thought
Liang Qichao's historiographical thought represents the beginning of modern Chinese historiography and reveals some important directions of Chinese historiography in the twentieth century.

For Liang, the major flaw of "old historians" was their failure to foster the national awareness necessary for a strong and modern nation. Liang's call for new history not only pointed to a new orientation for historical writing in China, but also indicated the rise of modern historical consciousness among Chinese intellectuals. He advocated the Great Man theory in his 1899 piece, "Heroes and the Times" (Yīngxióng yǔ Shíshì), and he also wrote biographies of European state-builders such as Otto von Bismarck, Horatio Nelson, Oliver Cromwell, Lajos Kossuth, Giuseppe Mazzini, and Camillo Benso, Count of Cavour; as well as Chinese men including Zheng He, Tan Sitong, and Wang Anshi.

During this period of Japan's challenge in the First Sino-Japanese War (1894–95), Liang was involved in protests in Beijing pushing for an increased participation in the governance by the Chinese people. It was the first protest of its kind in modern Chinese history. This changing outlook on tradition was shown in the historiographical revolution launched by Liang Qichao in the early twentieth century. Frustrated by his failure at political reform, Liang embarked upon cultural reform. In 1902, while in exile in Japan, Liang wrote "The New Historiography", which called on Chinese to study world history to understand China rather than just Chinese history. The article also attacked old historiographical methods, which he lamented focused on dynasty over state; the individual over the group; the past but not the present; and facts, rather than ideals.

Translator

Liang was head of the Translation Bureau and oversaw the training of students who were learning to translate Western works into Chinese.  He believed that this task was "the most essential of all essential undertakings to accomplish" because he believed Westerners were successful - politically, technologically and economically.

Philosophical Works: After escaping Beijing and the government crackdown on anti-Qing protesters, Liang studied the works of Western philosophers of the Enlightenment period, namely Hobbes, Rousseau, Locke, Hume and Bentham, translating them and introducing his own interpretation of their works.  His essays were published in a number of journals, drawing interest among Chinese intellectuals who had been taken aback by the dismemberment of China's formidable empire at the hands of foreign powers.

Western Social and Political Theories: In the early 20th century, Liang Qichao played a significant role in introducing Western social and political theories into Korea such as Social Darwinism and international law.  Liang wrote in his well-known manifesto, New People :

“Freedom means Freedom for the Group, not Freedom for the Individual. (…) Men must not be slaves to other men, but they must be slaves to their group. For, if they are not slaves to their own group, they will assuredly become slaves to some other.”

Poet and novelist
Liang advocated reform in both the genres of poem and novel. The Collected Works from the Ice-Drinker's Studio is his representative works in literature compiled into 148 volumes.

Liang gained his idea of calling his work as Collected Works of Yinbingshi from a passage of Zhuangzi. It states that "Every morning, I receive the mandate [for action], every evening I drink the ice [of disillusion], but I remain ardent in my inner mind". As a result, Liang called his workplace as "The Ice-drinker's studio" (Yinbingshi), and addressed himself as Yinbingshi Zhuren, literally Host of the Ice-drinker's studio, in order to present his idea that he was worrying about all the political matters, so he would still try his best to reform the society by the effort of writings.

Liang also wrote fiction and scholarly essays on fiction, which included Fleeing to Japan after failure of Hundred Days' Reform (1898) and the essay On the Relationship Between Fiction and the Government of the People , 1902).  These novels emphasized modernization in the West and the call for reform.

Educator
In the early 1920s, Liang retired from politics and taught at the Tung-nan University in Shanghai and Tsinghua University Research Institute in Peking.  He founded the Jiangxue she (Chinese Lecture Association) and brought important intellectual figures to China, including Driesch and Rabindranath Tagore.  Academically he was a renowned scholar of his time, introducing Western learning and ideology, and making extensive studies of ancient Chinese culture. He was impacted by a social-Darwinian perspective to researched approaches to combine the western thought and Chinese learning.

As an educator, Liang Qichao thought children were the future of the development of China, and he thought the education was significant for children's growth, and the traditional education approaches needed to be changed, and the educational reformation was important in Modern China. He thought children needed to cultivate creative thinking and improve the ability of understanding, and the new school became important to instruct children in the new approaches in the education. 

During this last decade of his life, published studies of Chinese cultural history, Chinese literary history and historiography. Liang reexamined the works of Mozi, and authored, amongst other works, The Political Thought of the Pre-Qing Period, and Intellectual Trends in the Qing Period. He also had a strong interest in Buddhism and wrote historical and political articles on its influence in China. Liang influenced many of his students in producing their own literary works. They included Xu Zhimo, renowned modern poet, and Wang Li, an accomplished poet and founder of Chinese linguistics as a modern discipline.

Publications

Introduction to the Learning of the Qing Dynasty (1920)
The Learning of Mohism (1921)
Chinese Academic History of the Recent 300 Years (1924)
History of Chinese Culture (1927)
The Construction of New China
The Philosophy of Lao Tzu 
The History of Buddhism in China 
 Collected Works of Yinbingshi, Zhonghua Book Co, Shanghai 1936, republished in Beijing, 2003,  /K.210

Family
Paternal grandfather
Liang Weiqing (1815 - 1892), pseudonym Jingquan
Paternal grandmother
Lady Li (1817 - 1873), daughter of Guangxi admiral Li Diguang
Father
Liang Baoying (1849 - 1916), courtesy name Lianjian
Mother
Lady Zhao (1852 - 1887)
First wife
Li Huixian, married Liang Qichao in 1891, died of illness on 13 September 1924
Second wife
Wang Guiquan, initially Li Huixian's handmaiden before becoming Liang Qichao's concubine in 1903

Issue and descendants

Eldest daughter: Liang Sishun (14 April 1893 – 1966), became an accomplished poet, married Zhou Xizhe in 1925
Zhou Nianci
Zhou Tongshi
Zhou Youfei
Zhou Jiaping
Eldest son: Liang Sicheng (20 April 1901 - 9 January 1972), became a famous architect and teacher, married Lin Huiyin (10 June 1904 - 1 April 1955) in 1928
Son: Liang Congjie (4 August 1932 - 28 October 2010), prominent environmental activist, married firstly Zhou Rumei, married secondly Fang Jing
Son: Liang Jian, son of Zhou Rumei
Daughter: Liang Fan, daughter of Fang Jing
Daughter: Liang Zaibing
2nd son: Liang Siyong (24 July 1904 - 2 April 1954), married Li Fuman
Daughter: Liang Baiyou
3rd son: Liang Sizhong (6 August 1907 – 1932)
2nd daughter: Liang Sizhuang (1908 - 20 May 1986), married Wu Luqiang in 1933
Daughter: Wu Liming
Son: Yang Nianqun (20 January 1964-), male-line great-grandson late-Ch'ing era personage Yang Du
4th son: Liang Sida (16 December 1912 – 2001), married Yu Xuezhen
Daughter: Liang Yibing
1st son: Liang Renyou
2nd son: Liang Renkan
3rd daughter: Liang Siyi (13 December 1914 – 1988), married Zhang Weixun
1st daughter: Zhang Yuwen
2nd son: Zhang Anwen
4th daughter: Liang Sining (30 October 1916 – 2006), married Zhang Ke
Zhang Antai
Zhang Anqiu
Zhang Anjian
Zhang Hui
Zhang Anning
5th son: Liang Sili (24 August 1924 – 14 April 2016), married Mai Xiuqiong
Liang Zuojun
Liang Hong
Liang Xuan

Liang Sishun, Liang Sicheng, and Liang Sizhuang were borne by Li Huixian.  Liang Siyong, Liang Sizhong, Liang Sida, Liang Siyi, Liang Sining, and Liang Sili were borne by Wang Guiquan.

Legacy
Liang's pedigree book was once lost with only one page left. The family members recreated the naming method by giving sixteen characters in a sequence, each generation following one. Liang didn't follow it by using ‘’ to his children.

See also
Gongche Shangshu movement

References

 
Chang, Hao.  Liang Ch'i-Ch'ao and Intellectual Transition in China.  London: Oxford University Press, 1971.
Huang, Philip: Liang Ch’i-ch’ao and Modern Chinese Liberalism (1972). Seattle and London: University of Washington Press.
Kovach, Bill and Rosenstiel, Tom.  The Elements of Journalism.  New York: Random House, 2001.
Levenson, Joseph.  Liang Ch'i-Ch'ao and the Mind of Modern China.  Los Angeles: University of California Press, 1970.
Li Xiaodong : Kindai Chūgoku no rikken kōsō – Gen Puku, Yō Do, Ryō Keichō to Meiji keimō shisō  (2005). Tokio: Hōsei daigaku shuppankyoku.
Li Xisuo  (ed.): Liang Qichao yu jindai zhongguo shehui wenhua  (2005). Tianjin: Tianjin guji chubanshe.
Tang, Xiaobing. Global space and the Nationalist Discourse of Modernity" the Historical Thinking of Liang Qichao. Stanford: Stanford University Press, 1996.
Wang, Xunmin. Liang Qichao zhuan.  Beijing: Tuan jie chu ban she, 1998.
Wu, Qichang. Liang Qichao zhuan. Beijing: Tuan jie chu ban she, 2004.
Xiao, Xiaoxui. China encounters Western ideas (1895 - 1905): a rhetorical analysis of Yan Fu, Tan Sitong and Liang Qichao. Ann Arbor: UMI dissertation services, 1992.
Yang Gang  and Wang Xiangyi  (ed.): Liang Qichao quanji  (1999). Beijing: Beijing chubanshe. (dates of letter before mid 1912 messed up).
 
Hsu, Immanuel. The Rise of Modern China: Sixth Edition. New York: Oxford University Press, 2000.

Further reading
 Lee, Soonyi. "In Revolt against Positivism, the Discovery of Culture: The Liang Qichao Group's Cultural Conservatism in China after the First World War." Twentieth-Century China 44.3 (2019): 288–304. online
 Li, Yi. "Echoes of tradition: Liang Qichao’s reflections on the Italian Risorgimento and the construction of Chinese nationalism." Journal of Modern Chinese History 8.1 (2014): 25–42.
 Liang Chi-chao (Liang Qichao) 梁啓超 from Biographies of Prominent Chinese .1925.
 
Shiqiao, Li. "Writing a Modern Chinese Architectural History: Liang Sicheng and Liang Qichao." Journal of Architectural Education 56.1 (2002): 35–45.
 Vittinghoff, Natascha. "Unity vs. uniformity: Liang Qichao and the invention of a 'new journalism' for China." Late Imperial China 23.1 (2002): 91-143, sharply critical.
 Wang, Ban. "Geopolitics, Moral Reform, and Poetic Internationalism: Liang Qichao's The Future of New China." Frontiers of Literary Studies in China 6.1 (2012): 2-18.
 Yu, Dan Smyer. "Ensouling the Nation through Fiction: Liang Qichao’s Applied Buddhism." Review of Religion and Chinese Society 2.1 (2015): 5-20. online
 Zarrow, Peter. "Old Myth into New History: The Building Blocks of Liang Qichao's 'New History'." Historiography East and West 1.2 (2003): 204–241.

External links

CCTV article on the Chinese Revolution
Book Review: Liang Ch’i-ch’ao and the Mind of Modern China
Liang's former residence in Xinhui, Guangdong province (Photo) 
Democracy in China
Kang Youwei-Liang's teacher
Memorial hall for Liang Qichao at his former residence in north China's Tianjin City (Photo)

1873 births
1929 deaths
Burials in Beijing
Chinese Confucianists
Chinese expatriates in Japan
Chinese political philosophers
Historians from Guangdong
People from Xinhui District
Philosophers from Guangdong
Qing dynasty journalists
Qing dynasty politicians from Guangdong
Politicians from Jiangmen
Progressive Party (China) politicians
Republic of China historians
Republic of China journalists
Republic of China politicians from Guangdong
Academic staff of Tsinghua University
Writers from Jiangmen
Dramatists of Chinese opera